The 1992 PBA Third Conference Finals was the best-of-7 basketball championship series of the 1992 PBA Third Conference, and the conclusion of the conference playoffs. Swift Mighty Meaty Hotdogs and 7-Up Uncolas played for the 53rd championship contested by the league.

Swift Mighty Meaty Hotdogs won their first PBA title with a 4–0 sweep over 7-Up Uncolas, becoming only the second team to score a sweep in a best-of-seven championship series.

Qualification

Series scoring summary

Games summary

Game 1

Nelson Asaytono, Al Solis and Ricric Marata combined for 59 points to take over from a shackled Tony Harris, who was limited to his lowest output of the conference with only 31 points. The Meaties were never seriously threatened after a hot third period in which they outscored Seven-Up, 14–8 in a span of four minutes to seize a 71–59 lead.

Game 2

Tony Harris pumped in all but two of Swift's 23 points in the final period to salvaged a win. Harris capped his brilliant game with six straight points in the last 55 seconds to outlast the entire Seven-Up crew.

Game 3

Swift broke the game apart in the third quarter under a 21-point barrage in a stretch of eight minutes to forge ahead at 88–75. Seven-Up could only come closest at 87–98, before falling back as many as 18 points, 91–109. The Meaties' local starters; Jack Tanuan, Nelson Asaytono, Rudy Distrito and Al Solis combined for 63 points while Tony Harris scored 49 points.

Game 4

Seven-Up led at the end of the first quarter at 25–21, but the Meaties outscored them, 38–20 in the second period to take a 59–45 halftime lead. It was all Swift in the last 24 minutes of play as Tony Harris dominated, finishing with a triple-double of 58 points, 19 rebounds and 12 assists in a fitting finale on the last playing day of the PBA at the ULTRA.

Rosters

Broadcast notes

References

External links
PBA official website

1992 PBA season
PBA Third Conference Finals
Pop Cola Panthers games
TNT Tropang Giga games
PBA Third Conference Finals